Giovanni Battista Ala (c. 1598-c.1630) was an Italian organist and composer. Little is known of his life, but Filippo Picinelli praised him as an "excellent organist" and a "stupendous composer" in his Ateneo dei letterati milanesi (1670).

He was born at Monza and died at age 32, though his exact dates are uncertain.

Notes

References

Italian organists
Male organists
17th-century Italian composers
1590s births
1630 deaths
Year of birth uncertain
Year of death uncertain
People from Monza
17th-century male musicians